The Armenian Genocide Martyrs Monument, better known as Montebello Genocide Memorial, is a monument in Montebello, California in the Los Angeles metropolitan area, dedicated to the victims of the Armenian genocide of 1915. The monument, opened in April 1968, is a tower of eight arches supported on  white concrete columns. The memorial was designed by Hrant Agbabian. It is the oldest and largest memorial in the United States dedicated to the Armenian Genocide victims. The inscription on the memorial plaque reads:

As part of the Armenian Genocide Remembrance Day, thousands of Armenians from different parts of Greater Los Angeles area and American politicians gather in Montebello memorial every year on April 24 and lay flowers to the victims of the genocide.

History 
After the 50th anniversary of the Armenian Genocide in 1965, the Armenian community of Los Angeles decided to build a memorial, which would serve as a permanent location for commemorating the Armenian Genocide victims. They spent months looking for a site in the city of Montebello and came across land that the Bicknell family had dedicated to the city for public use. A group of Armenians led by Michael Minasian who was the founder of the Armenian Monument council started the process of exploring different architectural drawings. On January 12, 1967 the city Approved by a vote of 4-1 the design to build the Armenian Genocide memorial, the headlines read "CITY ACCEPTS PLANS OF ARMENIAN SHAFT". Armenians from around the world participated in the fundraising, which gathered $125,000.

According to journalist Garin Hovannisian, the building of the monument was a "milestone for the Armenians of the United States". Then he continues, "it had taken almost three years of city hall meetings, town hall debates, and community fund-raising to consecrate, in public park, a monument". He also notes that "ARF, Ramgavar, Armenakan, Apostolic, Catholic, Protestant, and every other category of Armenian converged at Bicknell Park for the opening ceremony". According to Hovannisian more than ten thousand Armenians attended the dedication ceremony. Then State Senator George Deukmejian, who would later become Governor of California, read Governor Ronald Reagan's proclamation.

Signs showing the location of the Armenian Genocide Martyr's Monument were installed along California State Route 60 near the Garfield/Wilcox exits on March 22, 2011.

Notable visitors

Ronald Reagan, President of the United States
Serzh Sargsyan, President of Armenia
Bako Sahakyan, President of Nagorno Karabakh 
Arnold Schwarzenegger, Governor of California
Gray Davis, Lieutenant Governor of California
Barbara Boxer, US Senator from California
Adam Schiff, US Congressman
Jackie Speier, US Congresswoman
Grace Napolitano, US Congresswoman
Michael D. Antonovich, Member of the Los Angeles County Board of Supervisors
Antonio Villaraigosa, Mayor of Los Angeles Majority Leader of the California Assembly
Dianne Feinstein, US Senator from California
Eric Garcetti, Mayor of Los Angeles
Lee Baca, former Los Angeles Country Sheriff
Gil Garcetti, District Attorney of Los Angeles County
Carmen Trutanich, Los Angeles City Attorney
Charles Calderon, California State Assembly Majority Leader
Geoffrey Robertson, international judge and human rights activist
Israel Charny, psychologist, historian and world-renowned genocide expert
Jack Hadjinian Mayor of Montebello
Mark Geragos, Armenian-American lawyer
Sebu Simonian, Armenian-American singer
Judy Chu, US Congresswoman

Gallery

See also 

 List of Armenian genocide memorials
 Armenian American
 History of the Armenian Americans in Los Angeles

References and sources 
Notes

Sources

External links
 The official website dedicated to the centennial of the Armenian Genocide.

Armenian-American culture in California
Armenian genocide memorials
Buildings and structures in Los Angeles County, California
Monuments and memorials in California
1968 sculptures
Concrete sculptures in California
Montebello, California